Edward Charles Prescott (9 December 1880 – 21 June 1919) was an Australian rules footballer who played with Carlton in the Victorian Football League (VFL).

Family
The son of Charles Edward Prescott, and Minnie Prescott, née Keily, Edward Charles Prescott was born in Melbourne on 9 December 1880.

Football

Wiiliamstown (VFA)
He played for Williamstown Football Club in the Victorian Football Association (VFA) in 1902 and 1903.

Carlton (VFL)
In June 1904 the VFA permit committee refused to grant Prescott a clearance to transfer from Williamstown to North Melbourne (which at the time, was also a VFA club); however, several weeks later it granted Prescott a clearance to play with Carlton in the Victorian Football League (VFL).

In his single season with Carlton (1904), he played in 11 games and kicked 9 goals, and his last match was in the 1904 Grand Final against Fitzroy on 17 September 1904, in which he kicked one of Carlton's five goals (Carlton lost to Fitzroy: 5.7 (37) to 9.7 (61)).

Death
He died at South Melbourne, Victoria on 21 June 1919.

Notes

References

External links 

 
 
 Eddie Prescott's profile at Blueseum
 Edward Prescott: The VFA Project.

1880 births
1919 deaths
Australian rules footballers from Melbourne
Carlton Football Club players
Williamstown Football Club players